Thomas ten Brinke (born 23 February 2005) is a Dutch former racing driver who last competed in the 2021 Formula Regional Championship with ART Grand Prix. He previously competed in the Spanish F4 Championship with MP Motorsport.

Career

Karting 
Thomas was inspired by his fathers ventures in Rallying and Racing and started Karting competitively in 2018. He became champion in the 2018 German Junior Kart Championship, finished second in both the WSK Euro Series and the Italian Championship in 2019 and also won the 2019 FIA Karting World Championship in the OKJ class, whilst finishing third in the FIA Karting European Championship - OKJ and the 2019 WSK Champions Cup - OK Junior respectively.

Lower formulae 
In 2020 ten Brinke made his single seater debut in the F4 Spanish Championship with MP Motorsport. Despite not competing in the first six races, ten Brinke finished the season 3rd in the standings. He ended the year with one pole position, one win and an overall nine podium finishes. Ten Brinke ended his campaign on 187 points.

Formula Regional European Championship 
On the 20th of January Ten Brinke was announced as an ART Grand Prix driver for the upcoming Formula Regional European Championship. He had to withdraw from the first weekend at Imola after he tested positive for COVID-19.

Retirement 
Following his home race at Zandvoort, he made the decision to retire from racing with immediate effect, citing too much pressure to perform and a lack of enjoyment as his reasons.

Racing record

Karting career summary

Racing career summary 

* Season still in progress.

Complete F4 Spanish Championship results 
(key) (Races in bold indicate pole position) (Races in italics indicate fastest lap)

Complete Formula Regional European Championship results 
(key) (Races in bold indicate pole position) (Races in italics indicate fastest lap)

References

External links
 

Dutch racing drivers
Formula Regional European Championship drivers
2005 births
Living people
ART Grand Prix drivers
Spanish F4 Championship drivers
MP Motorsport drivers
Karting World Championship drivers